Francisco Diego Díaz de Quintanilla y de Hevía y Valdés, O.S.B. (4 October 1587 – 6 December 1656) was a Roman Catholic prelate who served as Bishop of Antequera, Oaxaca (1655–1656) and Bishop of Durango (1639–1655).

Biography
Francisco Diego Díaz de Quintanilla y de Hevía y Valdés was born in Oviedo, Spain on 4 October 1587 and ordained a priest in the Order of Saint Benedict.
On 8 August 1639, he was appointed during the papacy of Pope Urban VIII as Bishop of Durango.
On 8 January 1640, he was consecrated bishop by Juan de Palafox y Mendoza, Bishop of Tlaxcala, with Cristóbal Pérez Lazarraga y Maneli Viana, Bishop of Chiapas, and Mauro Diego de Tovar y Valle Maldonado, Bishop of Caracas, serving as co-consecrators. 
On 14 May 1655, he was appointed during the papacy of Pope Alexander VII as Bishop of Antequera, Oaxaca.
He served as Bishop of Antequera, Oaxaca until his death on 6 December 1656.

While bishop, he was the principal consecrator of Pedro de Barrientos Lomelin, Bishop of Durango (1656); and Juan de Montiel, Bishop of Santiago de Cuba (1656).

References

External links and additional sources
 (for Chronology of Bishops) 
 (for Chronology of Bishops) 
 (for Chronology of Bishops) 
 (for Chronology of Bishops) 

17th-century Roman Catholic bishops in Mexico
Bishops appointed by Pope Urban VIII
Bishops appointed by Pope Alexander VII
1587 births
1656 deaths
Benedictine bishops